The 2008 Pacific typhoon season was a below average season which featured 22 named storms, eleven typhoons, and two super typhoons. The season had no official bounds; it ran year-round in 2008, but most tropical cyclones tend to form in the northwestern Pacific Ocean between May and November. These dates conventionally delimit the period of each year when most tropical cyclones form in the northwestern Pacific Ocean.

The scope of this article is limited to the Pacific Ocean, north of the equator and west of the International Date Line. Storms that form east of the date line and north of the equator are called hurricanes; see 2008 Pacific hurricane season. Tropical storms formed in the entire Western North Pacific basin are assigned a name by the Japan Meteorological Agency. Tropical depressions formed in this basin are given a number with a "W" suffix by the United States' Joint Typhoon Warning Center. In addition, the Philippine Atmospheric, Geophysical and Astronomical Services Administration (PAGASA) assigns names to tropical cyclones (including tropical depressions) that enter or form in the Philippine area of responsibility. These names, however, are not in common use outside of the Philippines.

Seasonal forecasts 
{| class="toccolours" cellspacing="0" cellpadding="3" style="float:right; margin-left:1em; text-align:right;"
|- style="background:#ccccff"
|align="center"|Source
|align="center"|Date
|align="center"|TotalTCs
|align="center"|Tropicalstorms
|align="center"|Typhoons
|
|-
|align="left"|TSR
|align="left"|Average (1950–2007)
| –
|27
|17
|
|-
|align="left"|GCACIC
|align="left"|Average (1950–2000)|31
|27
|17
|
|-
|align="left"|GCACIC
|align="left"|April 18, 2008
|33
|30
|19
|
|-
|align="left"|TSR
|align="left"|May 6, 2008
| –
|28
|18
|
|-
|align="left"|GCACIC
|align="left"|June 24, 2008
| 33
| 30
| 19
|
|-
|align="left"|TSR
|align="left"|July 6, 2008
| –
|28
|18
|
|-
|align="left"|TSR
|align="left"|August 5, 2008
| –
|28
|18
|
|-
|align="left"|JMA
|align="left"|Actual activity
|38
|22
|11
|-
|align="left"|JTWC
|align="left"|Actual activity
|27
|27
|12
|}

Each season several national meteorological services and scientific agencies forecast either the expected amount tropical cyclones, tropical storms, and typhoons forming in a season and/or how many tropical cyclones will affect a country or territory.

 City University of Hong Kong 
Since the 2000 typhoon season, the Laboratory for Atmospheric Research or the Guy Carpenter Asia-Pacific Climate Impact Centre (GCACIC), both of the City University of Hong Kong have issued forecasts of activity for each upcoming typhoon season. Forecasts are issued in April and June of each year and predict how many tropical cyclones, tropical storms, and typhoons there will be in a season. This season, the GCACIC is predicting a slightly more active than usual season. An average season, according to the GCACIC, has 31 tropical cyclones, 27 named storms, and 17 typhoons. In its April forecast, the GCACIC predicted 33 total tropical cyclones, 30 named storms, and 19 typhoons before predicting the same number of systems, tropical storms, and typhoons in its June forecast.

 Tropical Storm Risk Consortium 
Since the 2000 typhoon season, the Tropical Storm Risk Consortium (TSR) of the University College of London have issued forecasts of activity for each upcoming typhoon season. During 2008 forecasts were issued in early March, May, July and August and predict how many tropical storms, typhoons and intense typhoons there will be during a season. In its March forecast, TSR Predicted that the season would be about 20% below average with six intense tropical cyclones, however due to conflicting climate signals it was not possible to predict how many tropical storms and typhoons would form. In its May forecast, TSR were now able to predict how many tropical storms and typhoons, would form during the season. They also predicted that the season would be near normal with 28 tropical storms, 18 typhoons and 8 intense typhoons forming during the season. In their July and August forecasts, TSR predicted the same amount of tropical storms and typhoons and intense typhoons as their May forecasts.

 National meteorological service predictions 

As the name Frank was retired from PAGASA's naming lists they also released a prediction stating that there would be 16 more Tropical cyclones of any strength to pass through PAGASA'S area of responsibility which added to the six that had already moved through PAGASA's area of responsibility brought a total of 22 cyclones to pass through the PAGASA's area of responsibility during 2008.

 Seasonal summary 

The first tropical depression of the season, formed in mid January to the west of the Philippines. As it moved west, the depression did not develop any further and dissipated on January 18. After two more Tropical depressions, the first named storm Typhoon Neoguri formed in April to the east of Mindanao. During May as a result of convection being enhanced within the Philippine sea and the South China Sea four named storms formed which along with 1971 and 1980 was the joint highest incidence in May since 1951. Between June and October, the region was considered to be very quiet by the JMA as they only named 13 tropical cyclones. In November and December, only four tropical cyclones were named by the JMA and all four formed within the Philippine sea and the South China Sea.

 Systems 

 Tropical Depression 01W 

The disturbance was located near to a developing low level circulation center which was weak and remained displaced from the deep convection whilst located in an area of low to moderate vertical windshear. During the next 24 hours the disturbance developed further with a Tropical Cyclone Formation Alert being issued the next day by the JTWC as the disturbance now had a well defined low level circulation center with convective banding on the northwestern edge. Later that day it was downgraded to a Tropical depression due to weakening deep convection and a partially exposed low level circulation center. Over the next few days the depression moved towards the east until early on January 18 when both the JMA and the JTWC reported that it had dissipated off the Malaysian coastline. There were no reports of any damages or casualties associated with the depression.

 Typhoon Neoguri (Ambo) 

On April 11, area of convection with an area of low pressure was located between Palau and Yap. Early on April 13, a low-level circulation developed near Mindanao. The JMA designated the system as a minor tropical depression on the same day, and PAGASA began warning on the system, naming it Tropical Depression "Ambo". The low continued to get better organized and early on April 14, the Joint Typhoon Warning Center began issuing advisories on Tropical Depression 02W, which was located about north of Zamboanga City, Philippines. Later that day, the agency upgraded it to tropical storm status, based on satellite intensity estimates. The JMA upgraded the system to a tropical storm, naming it Neoguri, the next day. Early April 16, the system was upgraded to severe tropical storm status, and then reached typhoon status a few hours later. The typhoon continued north, weakening as it did so. The cyclone made landfall as a weak tropical storm on Guangdong province in southern China, and the final advisories from both agencies were issued shortly after.

As the typhoon approached and passed Hainan Province, about 120,000 people were evacuated from low-lying areas. According to the China Meteorological Administration, it was the earliest in the year a tropical cyclone had ever impacted China (the old record was for Typhoon Wanda on May 3, 1971).
 42,000 residents were displaced in the aftermath of Neoguri. 18 Chinese fisherman and 22 Vietnamese fisherman remain missing due to the storm. Three fatalities were confirmed in China, two due to a road being covered in a mud flow, and another due to winds blowing a sheet of aluminum into a person, throwing them off the roof of a stadium.

 Typhoon Rammasun (Butchoy) 

Early on May 7, PAGASA designated an area of low pressure which was about 790 km east of Mindanao as Tropical Depression Butchoy. Around the same time the Japan Meteorological Agency (JMA) and the Joint Typhoon Warning Center (JTWC) also designated the area of low pressure as a Tropical depression with the JTWC assigning the number 03W to the depression.

Later that day the JMA upgraded the Tropical Depression to Tropical Storm status with RSMC Tokyo assigning the name Rammasun to the storm. It quickly organized, intensifying into a typhoon on May 9. Rapid intensification continued and it strengthened into a Category 4-equivalent typhoon by early on May 10, and a super typhoon by midday.

Soon after, the typhoon began slowly weakening. The JTWC downgraded it to a typhoon on May 11. On May 12, the weakening became more rapid, and the JMA downgraded the system to a severe tropical storm, while the JTWC issued its last advisory, noting that it was extratropical. The JMA, however, held onto Rammasun until early May 13, when it downgraded the cyclone to a low and issued its final advisory. Though it never hit land, it was the second strongest May typhoon in recorded history, behind Typhoon Lola of 1986.

Rammasun brushed the Japanese coastline as it became extratropical on May 13 delivering strong winds and high waves.

A strong storm from the "tail" of Rammasun struck the Philippines as it passed south of Japan. The winds brought by the storm caused severe damage to some buildings and numerous trees some weighing tonnes were uprooted. The damage may have been due to a possible tornado but there is no clarification for this possibility. At least 40 people were injured and damage totaled to 11 million PHP (US$280,000).

 Severe Tropical Storm Matmo (Dindo) 

The disturbance was located in an area of low vertical wind shear and had a consolidating low-level circulation center. The JTWC then issued a Tropical Cyclone Formation Alert on the disturbance early the next day, as deep convection was building near to the low-pressure area. Later that day both the JTWC and the JMA upgraded the disturbance to a tropical depression, citing good outflow. Early on May 15, as the storm was moving towards the northwest, the JMA upgraded the depression to a tropical storm. The Philippine Atmospheric, Geophysical and Astronomical Services Administration (PAGASA) then designated the storm as Tropical Depression Dindo. Early on May 16, both PAGASA and the JTWC issued their final advisories on the storm as it approached the edge of PAGASA's Area of responsibility, with the JTWC reporting that Matmo was now extratropical. Though, within their next advisory, the JMA downgraded Matmo to a tropical storm before dissipating the net day.

In preparation for Tropical Storm Matmo, the Japan Meteorological Agency issued warnings for the, Naha, Moji and Yokohama areas of Japan, but in the end, there was no impact.

 Severe Tropical Storm Halong (Cosme) 

Early on May 14 PAGASA upgraded a tropical disturbance west of the Philippines to Tropical Depression Cosme. Later that day the JTWC issued a TCFA, later the first advisory on the system as Tropical Depression 05W. On May 16, the JMA upgraded 05W to Halong. Later that day, it was upgraded to a Severe Tropical Storm by JMA, and a Typhoon by JTWC, and reached its peak of  early May 17. It made landfall on western Pangasinan early May 17, and weakened while crossing northern Luzon,ftp://ftp.met.fsu.edu/pub/weather/tropical/GuamStuff/2008051721-WTPN.PGTW but after reaching open waters it re-organized while accelerating northeastward. The system intensified to a severe tropical storm again, but never reached its previous peak intensity and began weakening as it moved northeast. The JTWC and the JMA issued their final advisories on May 20.ftp://ftp.met.fsu.edu/pub/weather/tropical/GuamStuff/2008052003-WTPN.PGTW

In Luzon, the storm caused 58 deaths and $94 million (USD) in damage. The storm destroyed 43,365 houses and damaged 188,830 more. Most of the damages reported were in Northern Luzon. Meanwhile, Mindoro and Panay islands were also affected as the storm-induced southwest monsoon brought rains and floods to those areas.

 Typhoon Nakri (Enteng) 

A tropical disturbance formed south of Guam on May 25. On May 26, the JMA recognized it as a weak tropical depression, and later that day, the JTWC issued a TCFA on the system.

Early on May 27, the JTWC issued its first advisory on Tropical Depression 06W. Hours after, the JMA designated the system as Tropical Storm Nakri. Early on May 28, the JMA upgraded it to a severe tropical storm. Twelve hours later, the JTWC upgraded 06W to a typhoon. Later that day, Nakri strengthened at a more rapid pace and the rapid intensification continued into May 29, when Nakri strengthened to a Category 4-equivalent typhoon. PAGASA then issued its first advisory on the storm on early on May 30 and named it "Enteng". By May 31 it began to weaken as it moved north. But on the next day, it started to re-intensify slightly. On June 2, it began to undergo transition to an extratropical system. And later, both JTWC and JMA stopped issuing advisories as it already degenerated to an extratropical low.

The name Nakri was submitted by Cambodia and refers to a type of flower found in the country.

 Typhoon Fengshen (Frank) 

On June 18, an area of low pressure that the Philippine Atmospheric, Geophysical and Astronomical Services Administration (PAGASA) had been monitoring for a few days was upgraded to Tropical Depression Frank. Later that day both the Joint Typhoon Warning Center (JTWC) and the Japan Meteorological Agency (JMA) started issuing full advisories on Frank with the JTWC designating it as Tropical Depression 07W. Early the next day the JMA upgraded the tropical depression to a tropical storm and assigned the name Fengshen. Tropical Storm Fengshen then rapidly intensified that day by becoming a severe tropical storm and then intensifying into a typhoon later that day. The next day Typhoon Fengshen made landfall in eastern Samar in the central Philippines and travelled northwest over the islands.

Fengshen was initially forecast to go through Bicol Region but later on shifted its course further westward, eventually going towards the direction of Mindoro Province. However, before even reaching Mindoro it again shifted its direction northward towards the direction of Metro Manila, mainly because of the weakening of the High Pressure area system in the northern part of the Philippines.

Typhoon Fengshen, after creating havoc in the Philippines, emerged into the South China Sea on the 22nd of June and moved northwards towards China. After moving into the South China Sea both the JMA and PAGASA downgraded it to a severe tropical storm while the JTWC downgraded Fengshen from a Typhoon to a Tropical Storm. PAGASA then issued its final advisory on Tropical Storm Fengshen (Frank) due to Fengshen leaving PAGASA's Area of Responsibility. Late in the evening of the 24th June Tropical Storm Fengshen made landfall on Shenzhen, Guangdong, before moving into mainland China. The next day the JTWC downgraded Fengshen to a tropical depression and issued their final warning on the system. The JMA then announced their final warning as they downgraded Fengshen to a tropical depression.

 Tropical Depression Gener 

On July 4, PAGASA reported that Tropical Depression Gener formed in the South China Sea to the west of the Philippines. The precursor to Gener earlier moved across Luzon, producing  of rain in the Ilocos Region. The system had deep convection persisting on the western side of its developing low level circulation center, although it was in an area of moderate wind shear, and rapid development was not expected. On July 7, Gener left the PAGASA area of responsibility. The Joint Typhoon Warning Center (JTWC) issued a Tropical Cyclone Formation Alert on July 7 as the circulation strengthened, despite the convection being disorganized due to the shear. Later that day the JMA reported that the system become a minor Tropical Depression, although the Hong Kong Observatory (HKO) did not follow suit. The system rapidly weakened as it moved ashore on China to the east of Hong Kong. Early on July 8 the JMA issued their last advisory on the depression. There was no damage reported in China, although the system produced heavy rainfall in Guangdong Province.

 Typhoon Kalmaegi (Helen) 

Early on July 13, the Japan Meteorological Agency (JMA), began to issue full advisories on a Tropical depression, which was located to the east of the Philippines. Later that day PAGASA allocated the name Helen to the depression, followed the next day by the Joint Typhoon Warning Center (JTWC) designating the number 08W. Early on the 15th July both the JTWC, and the JMA upgraded the depression to Tropical Storm status, with RSMC Tokyo assigning the name "Kalmaegi" to the storm. Early on the 17th, Kalmaegi began rapidly intensifying; both the JTWC and JMA upgraded Kalmaegi to a Typhoon.

In the Philippines, it passed over Northern Luzon (mostly affecting Ilocos and Cagayan Valley), where it killed two people, left more than 31,129 people affected and damaged ₱ 7 million worth of property. The storm also hit 82 villages (all in Northern Luzon) and caused around ₱45,000 worth of damage to farmland and livestock, Typhoon Kalmaegi, which was downgraded to tropical storm status by Taiwan's Central Weather Bureau while still east of the country, made landfall at Ilan County in northeast Taiwan in the evening of July 17 at 19:40 local time (13:40 UTC) and emerged into the Taiwan Strait at 7:20 in the morning local time (01:20 UTC) on July 18. At least nineteen died due to the storm and six are currently reported as missing. Tainan County (now part of Tainan City) in southern Taiwan reported more than 1100 mm of rainfall in some mountain regions. The storm caused NT$ 300 million worth of damage, including an estimated US$16 million in agricultural losses, and the typhoon destroyed about 5,100 hectares of orchards and crops.

From Taiwan, the typhoon, now downgraded to a tropical storm, turned toward southeast China. In that province and in neighboring Zhejiang Province, 360,000 residents left coastal and low-lying homes to escape the storm. Schools and many businesses remained closed, and the storm was expected to travel northwest. Early on July 19, the JTWC issued its final advisory on Kalmaegi and downgraded it to a tropical depression. However, the JMA continued to issue advisories and maintained Kalmaegi a tropical storm as it moved to Yellow Sea. Late the next day, the JMA downgraded Kalmaegi to a Remnant Low (Extratropical cyclone) as it moved in land over North Korea.

 Typhoon Fung-wong (Igme) 

On July 23 the Japan Meteorological Agency (JMA) started to issue WWJP25 warnings on a minor Tropical Depression which was located to the east of the Philippines. Early the next morning PAGASA named the depression as Igme. The Joint Typhoon Warning Center (JTWC) then initiated issuing advisories on the Tropical Depression designating it as Tropical Depression 09W. Later that day the JMA began to issue full advisories on the tropical depression whilst the JTWC upgraded the depression to tropical storm status. The JMA then designated it as Tropical Storm Fung-wong on July 25.

Fung-wong then carried on intensifying and during the morning off July 26 Fung-wong became a severe tropical storm. Later that day both the JTWC and PAGASA upgraded Fung-wong to Typhoon status. However the JMA did not upgrade Fung-wong to Typhoon Status until early the next morning. Later that day Fung-wong made landfall on Taiwan near the border of Hualien County and Taitung County as a Typhoon. PAGASA then released their final advisory on Fung-wong as it had moved out of PAGASA's area of responsibility.

 Severe Tropical Storm Kammuri (Julian) 

On August 3 at 1500 UTC, PAGASA identified a Tropical Disturbance located to the north of Luzon island in the Philippines and designated it as Tropical Depression Julian. Later that day the Japan Meteorological Agency (JMA) designated Julian as a minor Tropical Depression and initiated advisories on the Tropical Depression.

Early the next day the JMA started to issue full advisories on the Tropical Depression with the Joint Typhoon Warning Center (JTWC) starting to issue warnings on the Tropical Depression with the JTWC designating it as Tropical Depression 10W. Furthermore, later that day both PAGASA and the JTWC upgraded the Tropical Depression to a Tropical Storm. On August 5 RSMC Tokyo upgraded the depression to a Tropical Storm and named it Kammuri. PAGASA then released their last advisory on Tropical Storm Kammuri (Julian) as it moved out of PAGASA's Area of responsibility and headed towards Mainland China. The Hong Kong Observatory then upgraded Kammuri to a Severe Tropical Storm, with the JMA upgrading it to a severe tropical storm early the next morning.

However, Kammuri started to weaken after making landfall along the south coast of China in the Western Guangdong Province at about 12pm UTC on August 6. After Kammuri had made landfall the JMA downgraded Kammuri to a Tropical Storm, whilst the JTWC issued their final advisory later that day on Tropical Storm Kammuri. Early the next day Tropical Storm Kammuri emerged into the Gulf of Tonkin, however later that day Kammuri made landfall again in the Guangxi Province of China. After making landfall Kammuri weakened to a tropical depression as the JMA issued its last advisory on August 7. However the JMA continued to monitor the depression in their WWJP25 warnings until early on August 8.

 Severe Tropical Storm Phanfone 

Late on August 9, the Japan Meteorological Agency (JMA) started to issue full advisories on a Tropical Depression which was located southeast of Japan. Early the next day, the depression intensified into a tropical storm and was named Phanfone by the JMA as it moved northwards. Early the next day Phanfone became an extratropical low as the JMA issued their final advisory.

Phanfone was upgraded to a severe tropical storm in post-storm analysis.

The name Phanfone was submitted by Laos and is the name of an animal.

 Tropical Depression 11W 

Early on August 12 the JMA identified a weak tropical depression which was located to the northwest of the Ryukyu Islands, and initiated warnings on it. Early the next day the Joint Typhoon Warning Center initiated warnings on the depression designating it as Tropical Depression 11W. Early the next day as Tropical Depression 11W approached Korea the depression reached its maximum wind speeds of  However, later that day the JTWC issued its final advisory as due to land interaction the depressions wind speeds would weaken to below warning level. The next day the JMA released their final advisory on the depression.ftp://ftp.met.fsu.edu/pub/weather/tropical/Tokyo/2008081506.RJTD

 Severe Tropical Storm Vongfong 

The JTWC at this time also assessed the disturbances chances of forming into a significant tropical cyclone within 24 hours as fair. This was due to the tropical disturbance having a broad Low Level Circulation Center however the strongest winds were displaced on the eastern side of the disturbance. Early the next morning the JTWC reassessed the disturbances chances of forming into a significant tropical cyclone within 24 hours as good and issued a Tropical Cyclone Formation Alert on the developing disturbance. This was because the Low Level Circulation Center had become well defined.

Later on August 14, the Japan Meteorological Agency designated the tropical disturbance as a minor tropical depression whilst the JTWC also upgraded the disturbance and designated it as Tropical Depression 12W. Early the next day the JMA designated the depression as a full tropical depression, whilst the JTWC upgraded the depression to a tropical storm. Later that day the JMA upgraded the depression to a tropical storm, and assigned the name Vongfong to the storm. The JMA also then reported that it Vongfong had reached its operational peak winds of  10-Min) however this was later revised in its best track when the JMA upgraded Vongfong peak winds to  10-Min). Later on August 15, the JTWC reported that Vongfong had started to weaken from its peak. During the next day Vongfong carried on weakening. The JTWC then issued its final warning on Vongfong later that day as it had begun its extratropical transition. whilst the JMA kept issuing warnings on Vongfong until early on August 17 when they downgraded it to an extratropical low. The extratropical low of Vongfong then crossed the International Date Line and moved out of the JMA's area of responsibility and moved into the Central Pacific Hurricane Center's area of responsibility but they did not issue any warnings on Vongfong as it was extratropical.

As Vongfong brushed by Japan, heavy rains triggered flood which killed one person. A total of 523 homes and 39 hectares (96.3 acres) were damaged by the storm and 15,520 people were left without power. The storm also damaged 139 roads and caused 54 landslides.

 Typhoon Nuri (Karen) 

On August 17 the Joint Typhoon Warning Center identified a tropical depression located to the east of the Philippines and designated it as 13W. Later that day both the JMA and PAGASA identified the tropical depression and started to issue full advisories on the depression with PAGASA naming the depression Karen. Also later that day the JTWC upgraded Karen to a Tropical Storm.

The next day, both PAGASA and the JMA upgraded the depression to a Tropical Storm with RSMC Tokyo naming it as Nuri. It then intensified rather quickly with the JMA designating it as a Severe Tropical Storm with the JMA, PAGASA, and the JTWC upgrading Nuri to a Typhoon later that day. Late on August 19 Typhoon Nuri made landfall on the Philippines and then over the next day moved across northern Luzon causing 12 deaths and 461.3 million PHP in damage. that day Nuri entered the Babuyan Channel early the next day and started to move northwestwards towards Hong Kong and China. On August 21 PAGASA then issued its final advisory on Nuri as it was moving out of PAGASA's Area of Responsibility. The JMA then downgraded Nuri to a Severe tropical storm with the JTWC also downgrading Nuri to a Tropical Storm later that day as it was approaching Hong Kong. However, the JMA did not downgrade Nuri to a tropical storm until the next morning after Nuri had made a rare direct hit on Hong Kong. The JTWC then issued its final advisory later on tropical storm Nuri and the JMA then downgraded Nuri to a weak tropical depression early the next day and issued its last full advisory on Nuri as it was just moving into the Chinese mainland.

 Tropical Depression 14W (Lawin) 

On August 24, a tropical disturbance formed to the east of Luzon in the Philippines. Early the next day PAGASA designated it as Tropical Depression Lawin. However, the JMA did not designate it as a Minor Tropical depression until early on August 26, with the JTWC issuing a Tropical Cyclone Formation Alert at the same time. PAGASA then hoisted Public storm Signal number 1 for parts of Luzon which meant that wind speeds of 30–60 km/h were expected within 36 hours in the warning areas. Later that day both the JMA and the JTWC, started to issue full advisories on the tropical depression, with the JTWC designating it as Tropical Depression 14W. Early the next day the JTWC upgraded the tropical depression to a tropical storm, Although neither the JMA nor PAGASA upgraded the depression to a tropical storm at this time (or at any time during Lawin's existence), the JTWC then weakened the cyclone back into a tropical depression within their next advisory. The JMA then terminated issuing full advisories later that day as it was no longer expected to develop into a tropical storm. On August 28 the JTWC issued its final advisory on the Tropical depression followed by the JMA and PAGASA later that day. There were no reported casualties from Tropical Depression 14W (Lawin).

 Typhoon Sinlaku (Marce) 

On September 8 the JMA and PAGASA started to issue advisories on a tropical depression which was located to the north of Manila with PAGASA designating it as Tropical Depression Marce. During that afternoon the JTWC designated the depression as Tropical Depression 15W. Later that day the depression intensified into a Tropical Storm as was named Sinlaku by the JMA. During the next day Sinlaku firstly rapidly intensified into a Severe Tropical Storm and then into a Typhoon. On September 10 Sinlaku reached its peak 1 minute sustained winds of 125 knots (145 mph). During September 11 Sinlaku, started to weaken as it went under an eyewall replacement cycle. As Sinlaku moved through Taiwan Sinlaku turned to the Northeast and moved back into the South China Sea and started moving towards Japan. The next day as Sinlaku moved towards Japan it weakened into a Severe Tropical Storm and exited PAGASA's area of responsibility whilst the JTWC did not downgrade Sinlaku to a tropical storm until late on September 15. By then they were followed by the JMA which downgraded Sinlaku to a tropical storm early the next day. On September 16 the JTWC reported that Sinlaku had restrengthened into a Typhoon whilst the JMA reported that Sinlaku had strengthened into a Severe Tropical Storm. However, the JTWC Quickly downgraded Sinlaku back down into a Tropical Storm whilst the JMA kept Sinlaku at Severe tropical Storm strength. The next day the JTWC reported that Sinlaku had intensified into a typhoon for a third time however later that day the JTWC downgraded Sinlaku to Tropical Storm. On September 17 the JTWC issued its final advisory on Sinlaku as it became extratropical. However, the JMA kept issuing advisories on Sinlaku until early on September 21 when it became an extratropical low.

 Tropical Depression 16W 

Late on September 8, a tropical disturbance formed to the southeast of Japan. However the JTWC did not designate the depression as 16W until the morning of September 10. At that time the JTWC reported the depression had intensified into a Tropical Storm. However, later that day the JTWC lowered the storm back down to a Depression and then re-upgraded the Depression to a tropical storm. However early the next day the storm was downgraded by the JTWC for the last time as it had started its extratropical transition. Later that day as the depression raced into the Baroclinic Zone the JTWC issued its final advisory on Tropical storm 16W.ftp://ftp.met.fsu.edu/pub/weather/tropical/Tokyo/2008091118.RJTD

 Tropical Depression 17W 

The following morning the Joint Typhoon Warning Center assigned the number 17W to the depression. However, as it had already begun its extra tropical transition, this was the only JTWC warning issued on the system.ftp://ftp.met.fsu.edu/pub/weather/tropical/Tokyo/2008091412.RJTD

 Typhoon Hagupit (Nina) 

On September 14 a tropical disturbance formed to the northeast of Guam. Over the next few days it slowly developed, with the JMA designating it as a minor tropical depression on September 17. Later that day the Joint Typhoon Warning Center (JTWC) then issued a Tropical Cyclone Formation Alert on the developing tropical depression. Late the next day the JTWC designated the depression as 18W as it began to issue advisories on the depression. Early on September 19 the JMA began to issue full advisories on the depression as it moved into PAGASA's Area of Responsibility and was named Nina by PAGASA. Later that day both the JMA & the JTWC upgraded the depression to a tropical storm. The JMA named the storm as Hagupit, and assigned the international number of 0814. Early the next day Hagupit intensified into a severe tropical storm, and a category 3 typhoon later that day. It reached maximum intensity with  winds on September 23, and made landfall at that strength the next day. It then dissipated over land, thus late on September 24 JTWC issued its final advisory on the system followed by JMA early the next day.

 Typhoon Jangmi (Ofel) 

Forming south of Guam on September 22. JTWC issued a TCFA and upgraded the low-pressure area to a tropical depression on the next day. Both JTWC and JMA upgraded the system to a tropical storm named Jangmi on September 24, as well as it entered the Philippine Area of Responsibility, earning the name Ofel from the PAGASA. On September 25, Jangmi intensified into a typhoon for its developing eye. On September 26, Jangmi formed an cirrus-filled and ambiguous eye, as the typhoon gradually intensified owing to strong radial outflow.

On September 28, after JTWC downgraded Jangmi to a typhoon, it made landfall over Yilan, Taiwan at 15:40 TST (07:40 UTC). Jangmi weakened significantly by the mountainous terrain of Taiwan after landfall, and it arrived at the Taiwan Strait from Taoyuan County (now Taoyuan City) at 04:20 TST on September 29 (20:20 UTC on September 28).

On September 29, both JMA and JTWC downgraded Jangmi to a tropical storm in the East China Sea. On September 30, Jangmi underwent extratropical transition and became fully extratropical near the Ōsumi Islands on the next day. It ultimately dissipated near Iwo Jima on October 5.

 Tropical Storm Mekkhala 

On September 25 a tropical disturbance formed to the south of China, in the Gulf of Tonkin. Over the next few days it gradually intensified and late on September 27 the JMA designated it as a tropical depression. Early the next day the JTWC issued a Tropical Cyclone Formation Alert on the developing depression and then later that day, designated the depression as Tropical Depression 20W. Early on September 28 the JMA reported that the depression had intensified into a tropical storm and named it as Mekkhala. Later that day the JTWC upgraded Mekkhala to a Tropical Storm. However, on the 30th it began to move inland and thus, early that day, JTWC issued its final advisory on Mekkhala as it is expected to dissipate within a short time. Later that day, the JMA downgraded the storm to a tropical depression and issued the final advisory.

At least 21 people have been killed due to Tropical Storm Mekkhala. Damages from the storm totaled to $6.6 million (USD)

 Tropical Storm Higos (Pablo) 

On September 27 a tropical disturbance formed in the Philippine Sea to the east of Mindanao, in the Philippines. During the next day the JTWC issued a TCFA on the tropical disturbance. Early on September 29 the JMA designated the disturbance as a tropical depression. Later that day both PAGASA and the JTWC designated the disturbance as a tropical depression, with PAGASA naming the depression as Pablo whilst the JTWC designated it as Tropical Depression 21W. The JTWC upgraded the depression to a tropical storm early in the afternoon. The JMA followed shortly after and upgraded the system to Tropical Storm Higos early on September 30. Higos tracked towards the northwest and made landfall in the eastern Philippines (on Samar island) on October 1. Higos tracked over the Philippines as a tropical storm (but PAGASA downgraded it as a tropical depression) for most of the day before moving out over open waters. Once out over water, the JTWC downgraded Higos to a tropical depression, however, the JMA kept it as a tropical storm. As Higos neared landfall, it suddenly relocated, paralleling the northeastern coast of Hainan, China. The storm later made landfall on October 4 around 2 a.m. (CST) on the northern coastline of the island. JMA then issued its final advisory as Higos weakened to a tropical depression. The JTWC followed 12 hours later.

 Tropical Depression 22W 

The China Meteorological Administration and Hong Kong Observatory both declared this system a tropical depression that day as it moved slowly towards northern Vietnam. Joint Typhoon Warning Center begun issuing warnings late morning as a tropical depression and in the evening upgraded it to a tropical storm forecasting it to strengthen even further before making its landfall over northern Vietnam. The system didn't gain anymore strength in the Gulf of Tonkin and on October 15 made landfall over northern Vietnam. The Joint Typhoon Warning Center issued its final advisory on this system expecting it to dissipate near Laos by October 16.

 Tropical Storm Bavi 

On October 18 an area of low pressure well to the southeast of Japan quickly strengthened to become a Tropical Storm, and the JMA named it Bavi. Bavi strengthened to gain  winds, but transitioned into an extra-tropical cyclone on 21 October, while still well to the east of Japan.

 Severe Tropical Storm Maysak (Quinta-Siony) 

On November 5, a tropical disturbance formed in the Philippine Sea to the northeast of Zamboanga, in the Philippines. Later that day the JTWC assessed the disturbance chances of forming into a Significant Tropical cyclone within 24 hours as poor. Early the next day PAGASA designated the disturbance as a Tropical Depression and named it as Quinta, whilst the JTWC still monitored it as a disturbance. Later that day the JTWC upgraded the disturbances chances of forming into a significant tropical cyclone to Good and issued a Tropical Cyclone Formation Alert on the disturbance and then designated the disturbance as Tropical Depression 24W as they issued their first advisory on the Depression. On November 12, PAGASA issued their final warning as it transform into a low-pressure area. PAGASA renamed the system as Siony on November 12 as it redeveloped. Later that day, they issued their final advisory again as it moved out of their area of responsibility.

 Tropical Depression Rolly 

Early on November 7 a Tropical disturbance formed about 475 nm to the east of Zamboanga in the Philippines. Animated multi-spectral imagery at this time showed that the disturbance had disorganized convection which was located near to a developing low level circulation center and was located within a favorable upper-level environment for development. An anticyclone was providing vertical wind-sheer however the disturbance was already interacting with land as it was rapidly approaching Mindanao. Later that day after it had moved through parts of Mindanao it was named as Tropical Depression Rolly by PAGASA as they placed several parts of Mindanao and Visayas under public storm signal number one. All signals were then canceled the next morning as PAGASA released their final advisory on Rolly as it had weakened into an area of low pressure over Palawan. The JTWC then declared that the low-pressure area had dissipated later that morning. Rough seas produced by the depression capsized a vessel carrying eleven people. The Philippine Coast Guard quickly responded to the incident and rescued all crew members.

 Tropical Storm Haishen 

On November 14, the JMA reported that tropical depression formed  to the southeast of Iwo To, despite the JTWC noting the tropical cyclone formation was unlikely within the next 24 hours due to lack of deep convection. Later that day, deep convection began to persist near the center, indicating the storm developed a fully warm tropical core. Despite increased vertical wind shear, the JTWC issued a Tropical Cyclone Formation Alert on the system. During that evening, the JMA upgraded the depression to a tropical storm while the JTWC designated Haishen as a tropical depression. Traveling along the north portion of a subtropical ridge to the southeast of the system, dry air began to take toll on the system. The JTWC then issued their final warning later that day, as Haishen rapidly transitioned into an extratropical cyclone. The JMA followed suit 24 hours later. The extratropical low of Haishen accelerated towards the International Date Line, where it briefly reintensified.

 Tropical Storm Noul (Tonyo) 

On November 12 a tropical disturbance formed to the east of Mindanao in the Philippines. Later that day the JTWC assessed the disturbances' chances of forming into a significant tropical cyclone within 24 hours as Poor. The next day as it moved towards Mindanao, PAGASA designated it as Tropical Depression Tonyo. Early on November 16, the JTWC declared the system Tropical Depression 26W. On November 16, PAGASA issued their final warning as the Depression moved to South China Sea. On November 17 the storm dissipated over Cambodia and both the JMA and JTWC issued their final warnings later that day.

A landslide triggered by Noul killed a schoolteacher as she was heading home in Quảng Ngãi Province. At least 50 rescue workers searched for her through the debris before finding her body several days later. At least 20,000 people were in need of emergency assistance in the form of food, shelter, and water following the storm. Several other people were killed by landslides and flooding. In all, Tropical Storm Noul killed 21 people in southern Vietnam. During the storm, more than 2,000 people were isolated by floodwaters. Damages from the storm were estimated at VND143 billion (US$8.4 million). Offshore, a total of 115 boats sank due to the storm.

 Typhoon Dolphin (Ulysses) 

A small circulation formed over in a developing extratropical cyclone east of Japan on December 2. This type of formation is really rare, as the circulation moved east away from the developing cyclone and moved south on December 5. Dolphin was formerly an area of convection that had formed on the tail end of a shearline on December 7. On December 8, the storm gained more tropical characteristics, thus JMA defined it as a tropical depression. The storm then moved westward during the following days. On December 10, the JTWC upgraded the storm to Tropical Depression 27W when it was east of Guam. On December 12, 27W was upgraded to Tropical Storm Dolphin by the JMA. The name Dolphin was submitted by Hong Kong. Later that day, Dolphin entered the Philippine Area of Responsibility and named Ulysses. On December 15, the JTWC upgraded Dolphin to a typhoon. The JMA also upgraded Dolphin to a typhoon several hours later. On December 16, the JMA downgraded Dolphin to a severe tropical storm. Both agencies issued their final advisories on Dolphin on December 18 as it transitioned into an extratropical cyclone.

 Other systems 

Many weak tropical depressions are left unmonitored, or left unnamed.

A tropical depression existed in the central Pacific Ocean from January 22–23. It didn't affect any landmasses.

Another tropical depression existed from March 26–27, affecting Philippines.

On May 27, an unmonitored tropical depression affected the Philippines. It dissipated the next day.

Another tropical depression affected Japan and Ryukyu Islands on June 6.

2 more unmonitored tropical depressions existed from July 6–9 and July 13–15. It didn't affect any landmasses.

2 more unmonitored tropical depressions formed from August 10–12 and August 11–15. The first depression affected China and the latter affected Japan and South Korea.

Shortly after crossing the dateline, the remnants of Tropical Storm Kika entered the western Pacific basin and regenerated into a tropical depression. The depression continued to move towards the west-southwest before dissipating on August 16.

A tropical depression was left unmonitored on November 11–12. It stayed well from land.

The last unmonitored tropical depression existed on December 2. It stayed well from land as it dissipated.

 Storm names 
Within the North-western Pacific Ocean, both the Japan Meteorological Agency (JMA) and the Philippine Atmospheric, Geophysical and Astronomical Services Administration assign names to tropical cyclones that develop in the Western Pacific, which can result in a tropical cyclone having two names. While the Philippine Atmospheric, Geophysical and Astronomical Services Administration assigns names to tropical cyclones which move into or form as a tropical depression in their area of responsibility located between 135°E and 115°E and between 5°N-25°N even if the cyclone has had an international name assigned to it. The names of significant tropical cyclones are retired, by both PAGASA and the Typhoon Committee. Should the list of names for the Philippine region be exhausted then names will be taken from an auxiliary list of which the first ten are published each season.

 International names 

During the season 22 named tropical cyclones developed in the Western Pacific and were named by the Japan Meteorological Agency, when it was determined that they had become tropical storms. These names were contributed to a list of a 140 names submitted by the fourteen members nations and territories of the ESCAP/WMO Typhoon Committee. The names Matmo, Nuri, Noul and Dolphin were used for the first time as it was replaced from Chataan, Rusa, Pongsona and Yanyan.

 Philippines 

The Philippine Atmospheric, Geophysical and Astronomical Services Administration uses its own naming scheme for tropical cyclones in their area of responsibility. PAGASA assigns names to tropical depressions that form within their area of responsibility and any tropical cyclone that might move into their area of responsibility. Should the list of names for a given year prove to be insufficient, names are taken from an auxiliary list, the first 10 of which are published each year before the season starts. The names not retired from this list will be used again in the 2012 season. This is the same list used in the 2004 season, except for Ulysses, Vicky and Warren, which replaced Unding, Violeta and Winnie respectively. The name Ulysses is the only name which used for the first time.

 Retirement 

During the season PAGASA announced that they are going to removed the names Cosme and Frank due to extensive damage and loss of life. In June 2012 the names  Carina and Ferdie'' was chosen by PAGASA to replace the retired names.

Season effects 
This table will list all the storms that developed in the northwestern Pacific Ocean west of the International Date Line and north of the equator during 2008. It will include their intensity, duration, name, areas affected, deaths, and damage totals. Classification and intensity values will be based on estimations conducted by the JMA. All damage figures will be in 2008 USD. Damages and deaths from a storm will include when the storm was a precursor wave or an extra tropical low.

|-
| 01W ||  || bgcolor=#| || bgcolor=#| || bgcolor=#| || Philippines, Malaysia ||  None || None ||
|-
| TD ||  || bgcolor=#| || bgcolor=#| || bgcolor=#| || None ||  None || None ||
|-
| TD ||  || bgcolor=#| || bgcolor=#| || bgcolor=#| || Philippines ||  None || None ||
|-
| Neoguri (Ambo) ||  || bgcolor=#| || bgcolor=#| || bgcolor=#| || Philippines, China ||  ||  ||
|-
| Rammasun (Butchoy) ||  || bgcolor=#| || bgcolor=#| || bgcolor=#| || Philippines, Japan ||  ||  ||
|-
| Matmo (Dindo) ||  || bgcolor=#| || bgcolor=#| || bgcolor=#| || Philippines, Japan ||  None || None ||
|-
| Halong (Cosme) ||  || bgcolor=#| || bgcolor=#| || bgcolor=#| || Philippines, Japan ||  ||  ||
|-
| Nakri (Enteng) ||  || bgcolor=#| || bgcolor=#| || bgcolor=#| || Mariana Islands, Japan ||  None || None ||
|-
| TD ||  || bgcolor=#| || bgcolor=#| || bgcolor=#| || Philippines ||  None || None ||
|-
| TD ||  || bgcolor=#| || bgcolor=#| || bgcolor=#| || Taiwan, Ryukyu Islands ||  None || None ||
|-
| Fengshen (Frank) ||  || bgcolor=#| || bgcolor=#| || bgcolor=#| || Philippines, China ||  ||  ||
|-
| Gener ||  || bgcolor=#| || bgcolor=#| || bgcolor=#| || China ||  None || None ||
|-
| TD ||  || bgcolor=#| || bgcolor=#| || bgcolor=#| || None ||  None || None ||
|-
| TD ||  || bgcolor=#| || bgcolor=#| || bgcolor=#| || None ||  None || None ||
|-
| Kalmaegi (Helen) ||  || bgcolor=#| || bgcolor=#| || bgcolor=#| || Philippines, Taiwan, China, Korea, Japan ||  ||  ||
|-
| Fung-wong (Igme) ||  || bgcolor=#| || bgcolor=#| || bgcolor=#| || Taiwan, China ||  ||  ||
|-
| Kammuri (Julian) ||  || bgcolor=#| || bgcolor=#| || bgcolor=#| || Philippines, China, Hong Kong, Taiwan, Vietnam ||  ||  ||
|-
| Phanfone ||  || bgcolor=#| || bgcolor=#| || bgcolor=#| || None ||  None || None ||
|-
| TD ||  || bgcolor=#| || bgcolor=#| || bgcolor=#| || China ||  None || None ||
|-
| TD ||  || bgcolor=#| || bgcolor=#| || bgcolor=#| || Japan, South Korea ||  None || None ||
|-
| 11W ||  || bgcolor=#| || bgcolor=#| || bgcolor=#| || Japan, South Korea ||  Minor || None ||
|-
| Vongfong ||  || bgcolor=#| || bgcolor=#| || bgcolor=#| || Japan ||  Minor ||  ||
|-
| Nuri (Karen) ||  || bgcolor=#| || bgcolor=#| || bgcolor=#| || Caroline Islands, Philippines, China ||  ||  ||
|-
| 14W (Lawin) ||  || bgcolor=#| || bgcolor=#| || bgcolor=#| || Philippines, Taiwan ||  None || None ||
|-
| Sinlaku (Marce) ||  || bgcolor=#| || bgcolor=#| || bgcolor=#| || Philippines, Taiwan, China, Japan ||  ||  ||
|-
| 16W ||  || bgcolor=#| || bgcolor=#| || bgcolor=#| || Japan ||  None || None ||
|-
| 17W ||  || bgcolor=#| || bgcolor=#| || bgcolor=#| || None ||  None || None ||
|-
| Hagupit (Nina) ||  || bgcolor=#| || bgcolor=#| || bgcolor=#| || Philippines, Taiwan, China, Vietnam ||  ||  ||
|-
| Jangmi (Ofel) ||  || bgcolor=#| || bgcolor=#| || bgcolor=#| || Taiwan, Japan ||  ||  ||
|-
| Mekkhala ||  || bgcolor=#| || bgcolor=#| || bgcolor=#| || Vietnam, Laos, Thailand ||  ||  ||
|-
| Higos (Pablo) ||  || bgcolor=#| || bgcolor=#| || bgcolor=#| || Philippines, Taiwan, China ||  || Unknown ||
|-
| 22W ||  || bgcolor=#| || bgcolor=#| || bgcolor=#| || China, Vietnam ||  Moderate || None ||
|-
| Bavi ||  || bgcolor=#| || bgcolor=#| || bgcolor=#| || None ||  None || None ||
|-
| Maysak (Quinta-Siony) ||  || bgcolor=#| || bgcolor=#| || bgcolor=#| || Philippines, Vietnam ||  Minor ||  ||
|-
| Rolly ||  || bgcolor=#| || bgcolor=#| || bgcolor=#| || Philippines ||  None || None ||
|-
| TD ||  || bgcolor=#| || bgcolor=#| || bgcolor=#| || None ||  Minor || None ||
|-
| Haishen ||  || bgcolor=#|} || bgcolor=#| || bgcolor=#| || None ||  None || None ||
|-
| Noul (Tonyo) ||  || bgcolor=#| || bgcolor=#| || bgcolor=#| || Philippines, Vietnam, Cambodia ||  ||  ||
|-
| TD ||  || bgcolor=#| || bgcolor=#| || bgcolor=#| || None ||  Minor || None ||
|-
| Dolphin (Ulysses) ||  || bgcolor=#| || bgcolor=#| || bgcolor=#| || Caroline Islands, Mariana Islands, Philippines ||  ||  ||
|-

See also 

 List of Pacific typhoon seasons
 Tropical cyclones in 2008
 2008 Pacific hurricane season
 2008 Atlantic hurricane season
 2008 North Indian Ocean cyclone season
 South-West Indian Ocean cyclone seasons: 2007–08, 2008–09
 Australian region cyclone seasons: 2007–08, 2008–09
 South Pacific cyclone seasons: 2007–08, 2008–09

Notes

References

External links 

 Satellite movie of 2008 Pacific typhoon season

 
Pacific typhoon seasons
2008 WPac